Medjugorje is a town located in southwestern Bosnia and Herzegovina, about  southwest of Mostar and  east of the border with Croatia. The town is part of the Čitluk municipality and geographically part of Herzegovina. Since 1981, it has become a popular site of Catholic pilgrimage due to Our Lady of Međugorje, a purported series of apparitions of Mary, mother of Jesus, to six local children that are supposedly still happening to this day.

The name Međugorje literally means "between mountains". The town consists of an ethnically homogeneous Croat population of 2,306. The Roman Catholic parish includes four neighbouring villages: Bijakovići, Vionica, Miletina and Šurmanci. Since 2019, pilgrimages to Medjugorje have been authorized by the Vatican.

History

Early history
To the east of Međugorje in the Neretva valley, the Serbian Orthodox Žitomislić Monastery has stood since 1566. Gravestones erected in the Middle Ages have remained to this day in the Catholic cemetery Groblje Srebrenica in the hamlet of Miletina as well as in the hamlet of Vionica. In the area of the cemetery in Miletina, structures from the Roman era stood, whose ruins have not yet been fully excavated.

19th and early 20th centuries
Part of the Ottoman Empire until 1878, it became part of Austria-Hungary (War of 1878, Annexion 1908). In 1882 the railway line between Mostar and the Adriatic coast of Dalmatia was built, with a station in the hamlet of Šurmanci, through which the village gained access to the railway network.

The Catholic parish of Sveti Jakov ("Saint James") was erected in 1892 by the Bishop of Mostar Paškal Buconjić. The twelve-metre tall crucifix on the mountain called Križevac (Cross Mountain), completing the parish's Stations of the Cross (križni put), was completed in 1934.

Second World War

During World War II, the Franciscans of Bosnia and Herzegovina played a leading role in the slaughter and forced conversions of Serbs. Some Franciscan monks directly participated in the atrocities. On 6 August 1941, 600 Serb women and children were taken to the head of a quarry near the Franciscan monastery in Međugorje and killed by being pushed over the precipice and thrown into a pit.

66 Catholic friars of the Franciscan order were killed by the Partisans, mostly at the end of the war, including 30 at Široki Brijeg near Međugorje for their perceived involvement with the Croatian fascist Ustaše.

This was the place where, some 40 years after these atrocities took place and exactly 10 years before the Bosnian War broke out, residents began reporting apparitions in Međugorje, which called for prayer, conversion, fasting, penance and peace.

Reported apparitions

Devotion

Since 1981, when six local children said they had seen visions of the Blessed Virgin Mary, Medjugorje has become an unapproved destination of Catholic pilgrimage.

"Our Lady of Medjugorje" is the title given to the apparition by those who believe that Mary, mother of Jesus, has been appearing from 24 June 1981 until today to six children, now adults, in Međugorje (then part of communist Yugoslavia). "Most Blessed Virgin Mary", "Queen of Peace" and "Mother of God" are words the apparition has allegedly introduced herself with.

The Peace Rosary, also known as the Peace Chaplet of Medjugorje or Workers Chaplet, is recommended for regular prayer by Our Lady of Medjugorje: "There are many Christians who no longer believe because they are not praying. Therefore, start praying daily, at least seven times, Our Father, Hail Mary, Glory be to the Father, and I believe in God". Thus the Chaplet of Medjugorje consists of 1 + 7 x 3 beads, with a cross or medal. (The Chaplet later became a basis for a prayer for the seven gifts of the Holy Spirit, known as the Chaplet in Honour of the Holy Spirit and translated into many languages.)

The visionary Marija Lunetti (Pavlović) claims to receive messages from the Virgin Mary on the twenty-fifth of every month, while Mirjana Soldo (Dragičević) reports receiving messages on the second of the month.

The messages attributed to Our Lady of Medjugorje have a strong following among Catholics worldwide. Medjugorje has become one of the most popular pilgrimage sites for Catholics in the world and has turned into Europe's third most important apparition site, where each year more than 1 million people visit. It has been estimated that 30 million pilgrims have come to Međugorje since the reputed apparitions began in 1981. 

Many have reported visual phenomena including the sun spinning in the sky or changing colour and figures such as hearts and crosses around the sun. Some visitors have suffered eye damage while seeking to experience such phenomena.  Jesuit Father Robert Faricy has written about his own experience of such phenomena, saying, "Yet I have seen rosaries which have changed colour, and I have looked directly at the sun in Medjugorje and have seen it seem to spin and turn different colours. It would be easier to report that it is just hysteria except that I would then have to accuse myself of being hysterical, which I was not and am not."

Official position of the Catholic Church

On August 21, 1996, Vatican Press Office spokesman Joaquín Navarro-Valls declared that Catholics may still travel on pilgrimage to Medjugorje and that priests may accompany them. Navarro-Valls declared: "You cannot say people cannot go there until it has been proven false. This has not been said, so anyone can go if they want."

A Vatican commission to study the Međugorje question was set up by Pope Benedict XVI in 2010; headed by Cardinal Camillo Ruini, it was reported on 18 January 2014 to have completed its work, to be communicated to the Congregation for the Doctrine of the Faith. Pope Francis commented on the report as "very, very good" on 13 May 2017 when speaking to journalists. According to Italian media, the Ruini report divided the investigation into three main parts: the early apparitions from 24 June 1981 to 3 July 1981, the acclaimed apparitions thereafter, and the pastoral situation. The commission's findings were positive towards recognizing the supernatural nature of the first appearances, and rejected the hypothesis of a demonic origin of the apparitions. But it could not reach a finding on the reported subsequent apparitions, despite a majority of the commission recognizing the  spiritual benefits that Medjugorje had brought to pilgrims, including Pope Francis who remarked: "The third, the core of the Ruini report, the spiritual fact, the pastoral fact. People go there and convert. People who encounter God, change their lives…but this…there is no magic wand there. And this spiritual and pastoral fact can’t be ignored." 

On 11 February 2017, Pope Francis appointed Archbishop Henryk Hoser, S.A.C., the Bishop of Praga (Warsaw), as Special Envoy of the Holy See to Medjugorje. By the end of 2017, Hoser had announced that the Vatican's position was in favor of organizing pilgrimages. “Today, dioceses and other institutions can organize official pilgrimages. It’s no longer a problem,” explained Archbishop Hoser. “Pope Francis [even] recently asked an Albanian cardinal to give his blessing to the faithful at Medjugorje."  “I am full of admiration for the work the Franciscans are doing there,” the Polish archbishop reported. “With a relatively small team—there are only a dozen of them—they do a huge job of welcoming pilgrims. Every summer they organize a youth festival. This year, there were 50,000 young people from around the world, with more than 700 priests.”

He also cited the large number of confessions, adding, “There is a massive number of confessions. They have about 50 confessionals, which are not enough.”   “This is a phenomenon. And what confirms the authenticity of the place is the large number of charitable institutions that exist around the sanctuary. And another aspect as well: the great effort that is being made at the level of Christian formation. Each year, they organize conferences at different levels, for various audiences,” exemplifying priests, doctors, parents, young people and couples.  “The decree of the former episcopal conference of what used to be Yugoslavia, which, before the Balkan war, advised against pilgrimages in Medjugorje organized by bishops, is no longer relevant,” he said.

Development of the pilgrimage site
On 24 June 1981, reports began of Marian apparitions on Crnica hill in the Bijakovići hamlet, and shortly thereafter confrontations with Yugoslav state authorities began.  Pilgrims were forbidden from coming.  Pilgrims' donations were seized by the police and access to what was called the Apparition Hill was largely blocked.

In October 1981, Father Jozo Zovko, then the parish priest of the town, was sentenced to three and a half years imprisonment with forced labor for allegedly participating in a nationalistic plot. After Amnesty International, among others, appealed for his release and a judicial appeal was made, the sentence was reduced in the Yugoslav Federal Court in Belgrade to one and a half years, and the priest was released from prison in 1983.

In the last years before the breakup of Yugoslavia, travel of pilgrims was no longer hindered by the state.

Međugorje during the Bosnian War
During the Bosnian War, Medjugorje remained in the hands of the Croatian Defence Council and in 1993 became part of the Croatian Republic of Herzeg-Bosnia.  By the Dayton Agreement in 1995, Medjugorje was incorporated into the Federation of Bosnia and Herzegovina, populated mostly by Bosniaks and Croats. It lies within the Herzegovina-Neretva Canton, one of ten autonomous regions established so that no ethnic group could dominate the Federation.

On 2 April 1995, at the high point of conflict within the local diocese, Bishop Ratko Perić was kidnapped by Croat militiamen, beaten, and taken to a chapel run by one of the Franciscans associated with Međugorje, where he was held hostage for ten hours. At the initiative of the mayor of Mostar, he was freed without bloodshed, with the help of the United Nations Protection Force.

The Dutch professor of anthropology at the Free University, Amsterdam, Mart Bax, wrote in several publications that there had been mass killings due to a vendetta between clans during the beginning of the Bosnian War in 1991 and 1992. After much investigative research by journalists in several newspapers and comments from other scholars it appears unlikely that these mass killings ever occurred.

Development after the war

After the Bosnian War ended, peace came to the area and UN peace troops were stationed in western Herzegovina. Efforts by a politician, Ante Jelavić, to create a Croatian entity were unsuccessful, and Međugorje remained part of the Federation of Bosnia and Herzegovina.

The town and its environs boomed economically after the war.  Over a thousand hotel and hostel beds are available for pilgrims to the town.  With approximately one million visitors annually, the municipality of Medjugorje has the most overnight stays in Bosnia-Herzegovina.

The road network was expanded after the Bosnian War. In addition the hamlet of Šurmanci in the lower Neretva valley has a train station on the route from Ploče to Sarajevo.

On 6 April 2001, demonstrations occurred in the region, with some violence, after the NATO-led Stabilisation Force had closed and searched the local branches of the Hercegovačka banka ("Herzegovina Bank"), through which a large part of the currency transactions in Herzegovina, including international donations intended for Međugorje, were carried out, on suspicion of white-collar crime. The Franciscan Province responsible for the parish was a shareholder of the bank.

On 11 February 2017, Pope Francis named Archbishop Hoser from Poland his special envoy to Međugorje, tasked with assessing its pastoral needs. A couple of months later Hoser finished his work and returned home.

On 31 May 2018, Pope Francis named Hoser as special apostolic visitor to Međugorje, for "an undefined period and at nutum Sanctae Sedis" (at the disposal of the Holy See). The aim of this mission is "ensuring a stable and continuous accompaniment to the parish community of Medjugorje and to the faithful who go there as pilgrims, and whose needs require particular attention."

Pilgrimage to Medjugorje authorized by Vatican
On 12 May 2019, the Vatican officially authorized pilgrimage to Medjugorje. The first Vatican sanctioned pilgrimage then took place for five days from 2-6 August 2019. During the pilgrimage, approximately 60,000 young Catholics from 97 countries took part in the celebration of a youth festival. Fourteen archbishops and bishops and about 700 Catholic priests joined the festivities as well.

Demographics 
According to the 2013 census, its population was 2,265.

Notable people
Marin Čilić – tennis player, winner of the 2014 US Open
Ivan Dodig – tennis player, winner in doubles of the 2015 French Open
Andrija Stipanović – basketball player, Bosnia-Herzegovina national basketball team representative
Vladimir Vasilj – former Croatian football player

Gallery

See also
 Catholic Church response to the Medjugorje apparitions
 Radio Maria
 Chaplet of the Holy Spirit and His Seven Gifts

Notes

References

External links

 Shrine of Our Lady of Medjugorje – Official Website 
 Mary TV – Live streams from Medjugorje 
 Radio MIR Medjugorje 
 BBC Documentary from 1986 on Medjugorje, communist Yugoslavia 
 BBC Documentary from 2009 on Medjugorje, Bosnia and Herzegovina 
 All 1300 messages of Our Lady of Medjugorje on one page 
 Official documents about Medjugorje 

Catholic pilgrimage sites
Catholic Church in Bosnia and Herzegovina
Populated places in Čitluk, Bosnia and Herzegovina